The Attorney General of Ontario is the chief legal adviser to His Majesty the King in Right of Ontario and, by extension, the Government of Ontario. The Attorney General is a senior member of the Executive Council of Ontario (the cabinet) and oversees the Ministry of the Attorney General – the department responsible for the oversight of the justice system in the province of Ontario. The Attorney General is an elected Member of Provincial Parliament who is appointed by the Lieutenant Governor of Ontario on the constitutional advice of the Premier of Ontario.

The goal of the Ministry of the Attorney General is to provide a fair and accessible justice system that reflects the needs of the diverse communities it serves across government and the province. The Ministry represents the largest justice system in Canada and one of the largest in North America. It strives to manage the justice system in an equitable, affordable and accessible way throughout the province.

Doug Downey was appointed Attorney General of Ontario on 20 June 2019, replacing Caroline Mulroney.

Authority 
The Attorney General has the authority to represent the provincial government in court personally, but this task is almost always delegated to crown attorneys, or to crown counsel in civil cases. Both Ian Scott and Roy McMurtry, who were prominent courtroom lawyers before entering politics, acted for Ontario in constitutional appeals before the Supreme Court of Canada.

Most holders of the office have been practising lawyers or had legal training. Marion Boyd was the only Attorney General who was not a lawyer until Caroline Mulroney's appointment. Although Mulroney studied and practised law in the United States, she is not legally able to practise law in Canada.

Responsibilities 
The Ministry of the Attorney General delivers and administers a wide range of justice services, including:

administering approximately 115 statutes;
conducting criminal proceedings throughout Ontario;
providing legal advice to, and conducting litigation on behalf of, all government ministries and many agencies, boards and tribunals;
providing advice on, and drafting, all legislation and regulations; and
coordinating and administering court services throughout Ontario.

The Ontario Crown Attorney's Office, the Office of the Public Guardian and Trustee, the Office of the Children's Lawyer (formerly called the Official Guardian), and the Special Investigations Unit (SIU) all fall within the Ministry's responsibilities. The Ministry also funds Legal Aid Ontario, which is administered by an independent board.

Portfolios
In 2008, Office of the Independent Police Review Director (IPRD) was established under the authority of the AG, as a civilian body with powers invested through Public Inquiries Act to investigate complaints about municipal police forces and the Ontario Provincial Police.

Following the 2013 release of former Supreme Court judge Frank Iacobucci's report on the relationship between Aboriginal peoples and the Ontario justice system, a position of deputy attorney general with responsibility for Aboriginal issues was created.

List of attorneys-general

Attorneys-general of Upper Canada

1. John White (Frontenac County) 1791–1800
2. Robert Isaac Dey Gray 1800–1801
3. Thomas Scott 1801–1806
4. William Firth 1807–1812
5. G. D'Arcy Boulton 1814–1818
6. Sir John Robinson, 1st Baronet, of Toronto 1818–1829, acting AG 1812–1814
7. Henry John Boulton 1829–1833
8. Robert Sympson Jameson 1833–1837, last British-appointed AG
9. Christopher Alexander Hagerman 1837–1840, first Canadian-born AG of Upper Canada
10. William Henry Draper 1840–1841, last AG of Upper Canada

Attorneys-general of the Province of Canada (Canada West)

In 1841, the Province of Upper Canada became the District of Canada West in the Province of Canada

11. William Henry Draper 1841–1843
12. Robert Baldwin 1843–1848
13. William Buell Richards 1848–1854
14. John A. Macdonald 1854–1862, 1864–1867
15. John Sandfield Macdonald 1862–1864

After 1867, the Attorney General position was split into federal and provincial counterparts:

Attorney General of OntarioAttorney General of Quebec (renamed the Ministry of Justice in 1965)Attorney General of Canada

Attorneys-general of Ontario, since Confederation

See also
Government of Ontario

References

External links
 Ministry of the Attorney General website

Ontario government departments and agencies

Ontario
1841 establishments in Canada
Ontario